This is a complete List of Italian Football Championship clubs from the first season in 1898 to the present day.

From 1898 to 1929

A

B

C

D

E

F

G

H

I

J

L

M

N

P

R

S

T

U

V

The 1921–22 C.C.I. championship

After 1928–1929 season: the single table
In 1929 FIGC changed the mechanism of the championship, and created the Serie A as we know it today (a single league with 16, 18 or 20 teams).

Seasons in Serie A
There are 67 teams representing 61 cities that have taken part in 90 Serie A championships in a single round that was played from the 1929–30 season until the 2021–22 season. Milan, Turin, Genoa, Rome and Verona are the five cities that hosted derbies. Internazionale is the only team that has played Serie A football in every season. The teams in bold compete in Serie A currently.

 
16 of these teams actually play in Serie B and 22 belong to the Serie C, while the remaining 8 clubs lost their professional status.

By province
54 out of the 61 cities that host past Serie A clubs are present-day provincial capitals, while 7 not. The province of Forlì-Cesena is the sole one that was represented solely by a town which is not its capital. Consequently, 55 out the 107 provinces of Italy were represented in Serie A in their history, while 52 not yet.

By region
The following table lists the participations by region.

Lombardy was the region with the biggest numbers of team in a single championship, six.

War championships

1944 Campionato Alta Italia

This championship was disputed during the second World War and won by Vigili del Fuoco di La Spezia (V.V.F. Spezia, Spezia Firefighters). It was not recognized by the FIGC until 2002 and assigned to Spezia Calcio 1906, though Spezia's Scudetto is considered a "decoration".

(*) Audace San Michele and Pellizzari Arzignano retired after two matches.

The 1945–46 war championship

This championship is not usually included in the statistics, because some of the southern sides that took part to the competition were Serie B teams, while northern Serie B teams played at the second level with the Serie C teams. Torino's scudetto is considered official.

References

 Italian Football Championship
Clubs
Clubs